The 1995 Abierto Mexicano Telcel was a men's tennis tournament held in Mexico City, Mexico. It was the third edition of the tournament and was part of the ATP World Series of the 1995 ATP Tour. It was played on outdoor clay courts and was held from 27 February through 5 March 1995. Thomas Muster won his third consecutive singles title at the event and earned $43,200 first-prize money.

Finals

Singles

 Thomas Muster defeated  Fernando Meligeni 7–6(7–4), 7–5
 It was Muster 4th singles title of the year and the 24th of his career.

Doubles

 Javier Frana /  Leonardo Lavalle defeated  Marc-Kevin Goellner /  Diego Nargiso 7–5, 6–3

References

External links
 ITF tournament edition details

Abierto Mexicano Telcel
Mexican Open (tennis)
1995 in Mexican tennis